Ángelo José Henríquez Iturra (born 13 April 1994) is a Chilean professional footballer who plays as a striker for Polish Ekstraklasa club Miedź Legnica and the Chile national team.

Henríquez began his career with Universidad de Chile before moving to English club Manchester United in 2012. After loan spells with Wigan Athletic, Real Zaragoza and Dinamo Zagreb, he joined Dinamo Zagreb on a permanent basis in July 2015.

A full international since 2012, Henríquez was part of the Chilean squad that won the 2015 Copa América.

Club career

Early career
Henríquez began his football career with Universidad de Chile in 2007 at the age of 13, taking up the sport after he had stopped playing tennis, the sport that he played until the age of 12. In 2009, Henríquez went on trial with Manchester United, who purchased the rights to sign Henríquez for €4 million at any point until 2014.

Universidad de Chile
On 27 June 2011, Henríquez professionally started for the club in a Copa Chile match that Universidad de Chile beat Unión San Felipe 1–0 with a goal scored by Francisco Castro in the 80th minute. He failed to play in all the second semester, but was part of team directed by Jorge Sampaoli that was champion of Clausura Tournament and the Copa Sudamericana.

After the departure of Gustavo Canales to Chinese Super League club Dalian Aerbin, the club desperately tried to sign a striker, nonetheless, Jorge Sampaolí trusted the talented Henríquez to replace Canales in the starting line-up for the 2012 season, despite the interest of other clubs that wanted him on loan. On 22 February, he scored on his international debut in the Copa Libertadores in a 5–1 win over Godoy Cruz of Mendoza, in where Henríquez scored the last goal of the victory in the 90th minute. On 28 February, he incremented his goal tally scoring twice in a 4–1 win over Cobreloa, being this his first goals for tournaments of the Chilean Primera División.

Manchester United
On 21 August 2012, Manchester United announced that Henríquez had been granted a governing body endorsement which would allow him to register and play for the club. His signing was confirmed on 5 September, and he was given the squad number 21. Henríquez made his debut for United as he featured for the under-21 side and scored the final goal in a 4–2 win over Newcastle United.

Wigan Athletic loan
On 2 January 2013, Henríquez joined Wigan Athletic on loan until the end of the 2012–13 season. It was confirmed he could wear the number 11 shirt. He made his debut in English football as a half-time substitute for Daniel Redmond in an FA Cup third-round game against Bournemouth on 5 January, a 1–1 draw at the DW Stadium. His Premier League debut came two weeks later as a 71st-minute substitute for Emmerson Boyce against Sunderland, and eight minutes later he headed in Shaun Maloney's cross for Wigan's second goal in a 3–2 home loss. He won his first major trophy on 11 May 2013, as an unused substitute in the 1–0 FA Cup Final win against favourites Manchester City.

Real Zaragoza loan
Henríquez returned to Manchester United ahead of the 2013–14 season and scored the equaliser in a 1–1 draw with Swedish club AIK in the final match of the club's pre-season tour on 6 August 2013. On 28 August, he joined Real Zaragoza on a season-long loan. He made his Segunda División debut three days later, as a 54th-minute substitute for Víctor Rodríguez in a 1–0 defeat away to FC Barcelona B. On 21 September he scored his first goal, opening a 2–1 win at Real Madrid Castilla after five minutes. He scored six times in 25 matches, 20 as a starter, including a first-half brace in a 4–2 win at RCD Mallorca on 6 October.

Dinamo Zagreb

Initial loan
On 11 August 2014, Henríquez signed a loan contract with Croatian football club Dinamo Zagreb. Upon arrival he was given the shirt number 9, and made his debut for the club four days after signing in the league match against RNK Split, replacing Duje Čop for the last 17 minutes of a 1–0 win at Stadion Maksimir. He scored his first goal for Dinamo in the Eternal derby away to Hajduk Split on 31 August, coming off the bench for Ognjen Vukojević in the 59th minute and confirming a 3–2 win in added time. He then scored league hat-tricks against NK Lokomotiva, RNK Split and Hajduk Split, ending with 29 goals in 37 appearances in all competitions.

Permanent transfer
On 6 July 2015, Henríquez joined Dinamo Zagreb on a permanent deal for an undisclosed fee. He scored for the club 22 days later in the third qualifying round of the season's Champions League, heading the equaliser in a 1–1 home draw with Molde FK.

Club Atlas
On 27 December 2017, Henriquez signed for Mexican club Atlas costing €1.5 million. Officially announcing the signing on their website.

Return to Universidad de Chile
On second half 2018, he returned to Universidad de Chile to replace Mauricio Pinilla, staying until the second half 2021.

Fortaleza
On second half 2021, he moved to Brazilian club Fortaleza on a deal until 12 December 2022.

Miedź Legnica
On 15 June 2022, Henríquez moved to the newly promoted Polish Ekstraklasa side Miedź Legnica, signing a three-year contract.

International career
Henríquez has consistently participated in the youth national football teams in Chile, the 2009 South American Under-15 in Bolivia, where he scored two goals against Paraguay, and the 2011 South American Under-17 in Ecuador, where he scored against Colombia, Brazil and Venezuela.

Henríquez made his debut for the Chile senior team on 14 November 2012, coming on as a 20th-minute substitute for the injured Alexis Sánchez and scoring Chile's only goal with two minutes remaining with a header from Matías Fernández's cross in a 3–1 friendly defeat by Serbia at the AFG Arena in Switzerland. In his next game on 14 August 2013, he concluded a 6–0 friendly win over Iraq at the Brøndby Stadium.

In May 2015, Henríquez was included in Chile's squad for the 2015 Copa América. He made his first appearance in the final group game against Bolivia at the Estadio Nacional, coming on at half time for Sánchez and sending in the cross from which Ronald Raldes' own goal concluded a 5–0 victory. In the final against Argentina, he came on for Eduardo Vargas at the start of extra time, as Chile won their first major international honour in a penalty shoot-out following a goalless draw.

Personal life
He is the younger brother of the former footballer César Henríquez, who played for Universidad de Chile too.

Career statistics

Club

International

International goals
Scores and results list Chile's goal tally first.

Honours

Club 
Universidad de Chile
Chilean Primera División: 2012 Torneo Apertura

Wigan Athletic
FA Cup: 2012–13

Dinamo Zagreb
Prva HNL: 2014–15, 2015–16
Croatian Cup: 2014–15, 2015–16

Fortaleza
Copa do Nordeste: 2022
Campeonato Cearense: 2022

International 
Chile
Copa América: 2015

References

External links

Profile at gnkdinamo.hr

1994 births
Living people
People from Santiago
People from Santiago Province, Chile
People from Santiago Metropolitan Region
Footballers from Santiago
Chilean footballers
Chile international footballers
Chile under-20 international footballers
Chile youth international footballers
Association football forwards
Universidad de Chile footballers
Manchester United F.C. players
Wigan Athletic F.C. players
Real Zaragoza players
GNK Dinamo Zagreb players
Atlas F.C. footballers
Fortaleza Esporte Clube players
Miedź Legnica players
Chilean Primera División players
Premier League players
Segunda División players
Croatian Football League players
First Football League (Croatia) players
Liga MX players
Campeonato Brasileiro Série A players
Ekstraklasa players
Chilean expatriate footballers
Expatriate footballers in England
Expatriate footballers in Spain
Expatriate footballers in Croatia
Expatriate footballers in Mexico
Expatriate footballers in Brazil
Expatriate footballers in Poland
Chilean expatriate sportspeople in England
Chilean expatriate sportspeople in Spain
Chilean expatriate sportspeople in Croatia
Chilean expatriate sportspeople in Mexico
Chilean expatriate sportspeople in Brazil
Chilean expatriate sportspeople in Poland
Chilean expatriates in England
Chilean expatriates in Croatia
Chilean expatriates in Mexico
Chilean expatriates in Brazil
Chilean expatriates in Poland
2015 Copa América players
Copa América-winning players